Tilly Smith (born 1994) is an English woman who has been credited with saving the lives of about 100 beachgoers at Mai Khao Beach in Thailand by warning them minutes before the arrival of the tsunami caused by the 2004 Indian Ocean earthquake. Smith, who was ten years old at the time, had learned about tsunamis in her geography class.

Background

Smith was educated at Danes Hill School, an independent school in the village of Oxshott in Surrey, followed by Stowe School, a boarding independent school in the civil parish of Stowe in Buckinghamshire.

Smith learned about tsunamis in a geography lesson two weeks before the tsunami from her teacher Andrew Kearney at Danes Hill School in Oxshott, Surrey. She recognised the signs and alerted her parents, who warned others on the beach and the staff at the hotel in Phuket where they were staying. The beach was evacuated before the tsunami reached shore, and was one of the few beaches on the island with no reported casualties.

Smith's family declined requests to be interviewed by commercial and national broadcasters, but Smith appeared at the United Nations in November 2005, where she met the U.N. Special Envoy for Tsunami Relief, Bill Clinton, and at the first anniversary in Phuket, as part of a campaign to highlight the importance of education.

Awards and recognition

On 9 September 2005 Smith received the Thomas Gray Special Award of The Marine Society & Sea Cadets from Second Sea Lord, Vice-Admiral Sir James Burnell-Nugent.

Minor planet 20002 Tillysmith has been named after her.

In December 2005, Smith was named "Child of the Year" by the French magazine Mon Quotidien (a magazine targeted to young readers). At the official tsunami commemorations on the first anniversary of the tsunami held at Khao Lak, Thailand, on 26 December 2005, she was given the honour of reading a poem to thousands of spectators.

Smith's story is incorporated into many teaching resources for children about earthquakes, tsunamis and how to stay safe.

References

External links 
News article from National Geographic
Video interview by the UN International Strategy for Disaster Reduction

1994 births
Living people
2004 Indian Ocean earthquake and tsunami
English children
People from Surrey
Date of birth missing (living people)